Clain may refer to:
Clain is a surname. Notable people with the name include:

People with the surname 
 Elvira Clain-Stefanelli (1914–2001), American numismatist and advisor to the US Mint
 Fabien Clain (1978–2019), French purported veteran jihadist terrorist
 Médéric Clain (born 1976), French cyclist
 Pablo Clain (1652–1717), Jesuit missionary and scientist in the Philippines

See also 
 Similar surnames: Clein, Cline, Clyne, Klein, Kleine, Kline, Klyne